The aristocracy is historically associated with "hereditary" or "ruling" social class. In many states, the aristocracy included the upper class of people (aristocrats) with hereditary rank and titles. In some, such as ancient Greece, ancient Rome, or India, aristocratic status came from belonging to a military class. It has also been common, notably in African societies, for aristocrats to belong to priestly dynasties. Aristocratic status can involve feudal or legal privileges. They are usually below only the monarch of a country or nation in its social hierarchy. In modern European societies, the aristocracy has often coincided with the nobility, a specific class that arose in the Middle Ages, but the term "aristocracy" is sometimes also applied to other elites, and is used as a more generic term when describing earlier and non-European societies. Some revolutions, such as the French Revolution, have been followed by the abolition of the aristocracy.

Etymology

The term aristocracy derives from the Greek  ( from  'excellent' and  'power'). The royals and the aristocrats or people from noble descent were called "Blue Bloods" in medieval times in English language. In most cases, aristocratic titles were and are hereditary.

The term  was first used in Athens with reference to young citizens (the men of the ruling class) who led armies at the front line.  roughly translates to "rule of the best born". Due to martial bravery being highly regarded as a virtue in ancient Greece, it was assumed that the armies were being led by "the best". This virtue was called . Etymologically, as the word developed, it also produced a more political term: .

From the ancient Greeks, the term passed to the European Middle Ages for a similar hereditary class of military leaders, often referred to as the nobility. As in Greece, this was a class of privileged men and women whose familial connections to the regional armies allowed them to present themselves as the most "noble" or "best" of society.

See also

 Gentry
 Gentry (Landed - China)
 Gentry (Landed - Poland)
 Gentry (Landed - United Kingdom)
 Honorifics
 Monarchy
 Capitalism
 Nobility
 List of fictional nobility
 Upper class
 Imtiaz (Egypt)
 Chieftaincy (Nigeria)
 Old money
 Peerage (United Kingdom)
 Royal and noble ranks
 Styles (manner of address)
 Styles (royal and noble)
 Styles (United Kingdom)
 Titles
 Titles (false)
 Titles (hereditary)
 Titles (honorary)
 Social capital
 Social environment
 Symbolic capital
 Honour
 Moral responsibility
 Yangban (Korea)
 Kuge (Japan)
 Zamindar or Jenmi (India)

References

External links

 Heraldica: European Noble, Princely, Royal, and Imperial Titles

High society (social class)
Social classes
Social groups
Nobility
Oligarchy

pl:Arystokracja